This is a list of current and former on air staff for the ITN produced ITV News broadcasts which are transmitted on ITV.

Newscasters

Lead newscasters
Tom Bradby
ITV News at Ten (2015–)
Julie Etchingham
ITV News at Ten (2008–)
Nina Hossain 
ITV Lunchtime News (2004–)
 ITV News at Ten (2009–) 
Mary Nightingale 
ITV Evening News (2001–)

Other newscasters
Sameena Ali-Khan
ITV Weekend News (2006, 2021–)
Rebecca Barry
ITV Weekend News (2022–)
Paul Brand
ITV Weekend News (2022–)
Andrea Byrne
ITV Weekend News (2010–)
Gamal Fahnbulleh
ITV Weekend News (2021–)
ITV Lunchtime News (2022-)
ITV Evening News (2022-)
ITV News at Ten (2022-)
Duncan Golestani
ITV Weekend News (2019–)
ITV Lunchtime News (2021-)
Jonathan Hill
ITV Weekend News (2013–)
James Mates
ITV Weekend News (2002–)
Lucrezia Millarini 
ITV Evening News (2019–)
ITV Lunchtime News (2017–)
ITV News at Ten (2021–)
ITV Weekend News (2015–)
Rageh Omaar
ITV Evening News (2015–)
ITV Lunchtime News (2013–2015, 2021–)
ITV News at Ten (2015–)
ITV Weekend News (2013–)
Kylie Pentelow
ITV Evening News (2020–)
ITV Lunchtime News (2021–)
ITV Weekend News (2014–)
Chris Ship 
ITV Evening News (2021–)
ITV Lunchtime News (2019–)
ITV Weekend News (2009–)
ITV News at Ten (2022–)
Geraint Vincent 
ITV Lunchtime News (2006–2012, 2021–)
ITV Weekend News (2006–2012, 2021–)
ITV Evening News (2018–)
Lucy Watson
ITV Lunchtime News (2022–)
ITV Weekend News (2021–)
Romilly Weeks
ITV Evening News (2006–2014, 2021–)
ITV Lunchtime News (2006–)
ITV Weekend News (2006–)
Charlene White
ITV Evening News (2014–)
ITV Lunchtime News (2014–)
ITV News at Ten (2014–2015, 2020–)

Former newscasters

Fiona Armstrong (1985–1993)
Pamela Armstrong (1984–1986)
Mark Austin (1998–2016)
Matt Barbet (2013–2014)
Carol Barnes (1980–1999, 2003-2004)
Felicity Barr (2002–2006)
Alison Bell (2000–2003)
Reginald Bosanquet (1967–1979)
Timothy Brinton (1959–1962)
Sir Alastair Burnet (1963–1991)
Sue Carpenter (1986–1992)
Andrea Catherwood (2003–2006)
Christopher Chataway (1955–1956)
Steve Clamp (2009–2010, 2012)
Sir Robin Day (1955–1959)
Katie Derham (1998–2010)
Ali Douglas (2010–2012)
Mimi Fawaz
Anna Ford (1977–1981)
Sandy Gall (1963–1992)
Andrew Gardner (1962–1977)
Shiulie Ghosh (1998–2006)
Jon Gilbert (2009–2012)
Andrew Harvey (2000–2001)
Charlotte Hawkins (2005)
Gordon Honeycombe (1965–1977)
Alex Hyndman (2009–2013)
Jackie Kabler (2008–2012)
Natasha Kaplinsky (2011–2016)
Robert Kee (1972–1976)
Ludovic Kennedy (1956–1958)
Martyn Lewis (1979–1986)
Barbara Mandell (1955–1960)
Daisy McAndrew (2006–2007, 2010–2011)
Sir Trevor McDonald (1977–2005, 2008)
Rachel McTavish (1997–2007, 2011–2012)
Lucy Meacock (2007–2009, 2011–2015)
Graham Miller (1993–1999)
Ivor Mills (1965–1978)
Saima Mohsin 
Dermot Murnaghan (1989–2002)
Bill Neely (2004–2008)
John Nicolson
Michael Nicholson (1976–1986)
Joyce Ohajah (2003–2005)
Nicholas Owen (1984–2006)
Leonard Parkin (1967–1987)
Sonia Ruseler (1992–1993)
Selina Scott (1980–1983)
Steve Scott  (2005–2015)
Ranvir Singh (2014–2020)
Salma Siraj 
Peter Sissons (1967–1982)
Jon Snow (1987–1989)
Julia Somerville (1987–2001)
Alastair Stewart (1980–1992, 2003–2020)
John Suchet (1980–2004)
Matt Teale (2009–2014)
Owen Thomas (2001–2005)
Pip Tomson (2005)
Denis Tuohy (1994–2000)
Mark Webster (1982–2005)
Tim Willcox (1998–2001)
Sascha Williams (2009–2014)
Kirsty Young (2000–2001)

Correspondents/Editors

International
Debi Edward: Asia Correspondent 
John Irvine: Senior International Correspondent
Rageh Omaar: International Affairs Editor
Penny Marshall: Africa Correspondent
James Mates: Europe Editor
Robert Moore: Washington Correspondent 
Emma Murphy: U.S. Correspondent 
Dan Rivers: U.S. Correspondent

National
Paul Brand: UK Editor
Ben Chapman: Midlands Correspondent
Rupert Evelyn: West of England Correspondent
Kelly Foran: North of England Reporter 
Stacey Foster: Midlands Reporter
Sangita Lal: North of England Reporter
Marc Mallett: Northern Ireland Correspondent
Louise Scott: Scotland Reporter 
Peter Smith: Scotland Correspondent
Rachel Townsend: North of England Reporter
Rhys Williams: Wales Reporter

Political
Anushka Asthana: Deputy Political Editor 
Carl Dinnen: Political Correspondent
Harry Horton: Political Correspondent
Amy Lewis: Political Reporter
Robert Peston: Political Editor
Romilly Weeks: Political Correspondent
Libby Wiener: Political Correspondent

Specialist
Chris Choi: Consumer Editor
Sarah Corker: Social Affairs Correspondent 
Rishi Davda: Entertainment Reporter
Daniel Hewitt: Investigations Correspondent
Joel Hills: Business/Economics Editor
Rohit Kachroo: Global Security Editor 
Emily Morgan: Health/Science Editor
Nina Nannar: Arts Editor
Chris Ship: Royal Editor
Martin Stew: Health/Science Correspondent

Sports
Steve Scott Sports Editor
Chris Skudder: Sports Reporter

General News
Faye Barker
Rebecca Barry
Sally Biddulph 
Yasmin Bodalbhai
Neil Connery
Cari Davies
Martha Fairlie
Raveena Ghattaura
Sam Holder
Sejal Karia
Chloe Keedy
Shehab Khan
Kaf Okpattah 
Ellie Pitt
John Ray
Dani Sinha
Ayshah Tull
Geraint Vincent
Suzanne Virdee
Lucy Watson
Ian Woods
Rachel Younger

Notes
 Reporters from regional ITV News services (as well as from STV) and Good Morning Britain appear on national news bulletins (in particular, the ITV Lunchtime News) in the absence of any ITN correspondent or reporter. 
National Correspondents occasionally report from out-with their main coverage area.
In addition, CNN correspondents are occasionally featured on the aforementioned programme to provide analysis and details of any breaking international stories.

See also
List of ITV Weather on air staff

References

External links

ITN.co.uk

ITV News on air staff
ITV News on air staff
ITV News on air staff
ITV News on air staff